The Marganit Tower is a skyscraper located in HaKirya, Tel Aviv, Israel. As such, it only has 17 floors. Now Israel's twelfth-tallest building, upon completion it was the country's second-tallest building. It was designed by ASSA Architects.

Marganit Tower is slanted  to the right-hand side, a fact that was discovered in the middle of construction on April 5, 1989. Construction work continued after the checkup and approval of the tower's engineers.

See also
List of tallest buildings and structures in Israel
Architecture of Israel

References

External links

Buildings and structures completed in 1987
Skyscrapers in Tel Aviv
Skyscraper office buildings in Israel